Wonga Beach is a coastal locality in the Shire of Douglas, Queensland, Australia. The town of Wonga is within the locality.

Geography 
Wonga Beach is a beachside locality situated between the small residential towns of Rocky Point (sometimes referred to as Dayman Point) and the Daintree township. In 1985 a large volcanic eruption beneath the Coral Sea released thousands of Pumice stones to the ocean surface which were then blown along north Queensland's shore by the trade winds.

History 
In 1999, the school was relocated to Wonga Beach and renamed Wonga Beach State School. Most of the Rocky Point school buildings were sold for housing, but one was relocated to Wonga Beach.

Fauna 
Birdwatchers visit Wonga Beach to see three uncommon bird species: Gould's bronze cuckoo, double-eyed fig-parrot and the beach stone-curlew. The last species is easily confused with the ubiquitous bush stone-curlew noted for its wailing calls at night.

Services 
In addition to automotive fuels, the Caltex service station incorporates a small convenience store with an ATM. The site was previously run as a British Petroleum and before that Mobil but changed to Caltex in 2007. Nearby there are picnic tables, a post box, telephone booth and a display of model cassowaries. In 2011 three shops were added to the complex.  A pharmacy opened, and the other shops are available to rent. The Caltex service station is the only fuel outlet in the Daintree Valley and opens early (5:30am) and closes at 8:30pm.

Education 
Wonga Beach State School is a government primary (Prep-6) school for boys and girls at 48-74 Snapper Island Drive. In 2017, the school had an enrolment of 90 students with 10 teachers (6 full-time equivalent) and 7 non-teaching staff (4 full-time equivalent).

The school is known as a SunSmart school (an initiative of The Cancer Council Australia), enforcing strict rules on UV-protection. The school has a large area of swampland, the maintenance of which has been made a school project, with an 'eco-maze' currently being developed in the site.

School buses run twice daily from New Wonga to Old Wonga, then on to Mossman.  These buses are not available to the public.

There are no secondary schools in Wonga Beach. The nearest government secondary school is Mossman State High School in Mossman to the south-west.

References

External links

 

Shire of Douglas
Beaches of Queensland
Localities in Queensland